KYSF (97.5 FM, "Air 1") is a radio station licensed to Bonanza, Oregon, United States. The station is owned by Educational Media Foundation.

Programming
KYSF broadcasts a Christian Worship music format to the greater Klamath Falls-Altamont, Oregon area. From 2009 to early 2012, almost all programming except syndicated programming heard on KYSF was from Dial Global's Hits NOW! satellite format. Syndicated programming on KYSF included Rick Dees' Weekly Top 40, Kidd Kraddick in the Morning and Baka Boyz Hip-Hop Mastermix.

History
This station received its original construction permit from the FCC on August 9, 1996.  The new station was assigned the call letters KAQX by the FCC on October 25, 1996.  KAQX received its license to cover from the FCC on February 5, 1999.

The station was assigned the current call sign by the FCC on June 17, 1999.

On January 5, 2012, KYSF changed its format from contemporary hits to EMF's K-Love contemporary Christian format.

On February 11, 2014, KYSF moved from 102.9 FM to 97.5 FM. The station was licensed to operate at 97.5 FM on January 13, 2015. By 2018, KYSF was broadcasting K-Love's sister station feed, Air 1 which flipped formats to Christian Worship in January 2019.

Previous logo

References

External links
New Northwest Broadcasters station profile

FCC application

Radio stations established in 1999
Klamath County, Oregon
1999 establishments in Oregon
Air1 radio stations
Educational Media Foundation radio stations
YSF